Gwili Andre (born Gurli Ingeborg Elna Andresen, 4 February 1907 – 5 February 1959) was a Danish model and actress who had a brief career in Hollywood films. (Another source gives her birth date as 4 February 1907.)

Early years
Born in Frederiksberg, Andre had two sisters. Her parents were Carl Axel Andresen and Emma Marie Ellen Sørensen Bruun, they married in 1904. Her parents divorced, and her father remarried in 1917.

Career 
Andre came to Hollywood in the early 1930s with the intention of establishing herself as a film star after working as model in Europe. In 1930, she moved to New York City with her first husband where she was reportedly spotted by David O. Selznick at the premiere of a Broadway show. Selznick was taken by her beauty and arranged for a screen test.

She was signed to RKO Studio and, in 1932 appeared in Roar of the Dragon and Secrets of the French Police. While her striking looks were likened to that of Greta Garbo and Marlene Dietrich, her acting garnered poor reviews. One newspaper columnist called her "stiff, colorless and completely talentless performer." Despite the poor reviews of her acting, RKO began using her glamorous looks to promote her career. A widespread publicity campaign ensured that her name and face became well known to the American public, but her next role in No Other Woman (1933), opposite Irene Dunne, was not the success the studio expected. Over the next few years she was relegated to supporting roles which included a role in the Joan Crawford picture A Woman's Face (1941).

Personal life
Andre was married twice. She was married to realtor Stanisław Mlotkowski in 1929. They separated in 1930, and divorced in 1935. Andre then married engineer William Dallas Cross, Jr. in 1943. They had a son, Peter Lance Cross, in February 1944. They divorced in 1948.

Later years and death
By the early 1940s, Andre's film career had come to a standstill. Her final role was a minor part in one of the popular Falcon series, The Falcon's Brother in 1942. She did not return to the screen, although she spent the rest of her life trying to orchestrate a comeback. Andre returned to her native Denmark with her son after her divorce from William Cross, Jr. but returned to New York City in 1954. She eventually moved back to California.

On 5 February 1959, Andre died in a fire that started in her Venice, California apartment where she lived alone. The cause of the fire was never determined. Upon her death, she was cremated at Forest Lawn Memorial Park in Glendale, California, and her ashes sent for burial at Søndermark Cemetery in Copenhagen, Denmark.

Filmography

References

External links

Gwili Andre Article at Bellaonline.com

County of Copenhagen, Sokkelund, Frederiksberg, 1904-1909 birth record Gwili # 33, bottom of the page.

1907 births
1959 deaths
20th-century Danish actresses
Accidental deaths in California
Danish emigrants to the United States
Danish expatriates in the United States
Danish female models
Danish film actresses
Deaths from fire in the United States
Actresses from Copenhagen